The BFW CL.I was a prototype German escort fighter aircraft of World War I.

Design and development
The CL.I first flew April 1918, but was considered to be inferior in performance to the Hannover CL.V. Thus, improvements were made and the aircraft was returned to BFW, fitted with a lighter fuselage and redesignated CL.Ia. Results of tests performed on 14 September 1918 were declared unsatisfactory. BFW commenced a redesign of the CL.Ia to produce an entirely new aircraft, the CL.III, of which a single prototype was built but not flown due to the Armistice of November 1918. A further development of the BFW CL.III, the CL.IV, remained a paper project only.

The second CL.I prototype (known as Type 18 by BFW) was fitted with a  MAN Mana III six-cylinder in-line engine and designated CL.II, with test flights in July 1918.

Variants
 CL.I (company designation BFW type 17) the initial design; two built
 CL.Ia with lighter fuselage; one converted from a CL.I
 CL.II (company designation BFW type 18) one of the CL.Is fitted with a  MAN Mana III engine
 CL.III Re-design of the CL.Ia; one built.
 CL.IV further development not completed before the armistice.

Specifications (CL.Ia)

References

 William Green and Gordon Swanborough; The Complete Book of Fighters, Salamander, 1994.

CL.I
Aircraft first flown in 1918
Biplanes
1910s German attack aircraft
1910s German fighter aircraft
Military aircraft of World War I
Single-engined tractor aircraft